Lac-des-Écorces is a municipality and village in the Laurentides region of Quebec, Canada, part of the Antoine-Labelle Regional County Municipality.

It is named after Bark Lake (Lac des Écorces) that is on its western boundary.

History
On October 10, 2002, the Municipality of Beaux-Rivages, the Village of Lac-des-Écorces, and the Village of Val-Barrette merged to form the new Municipality of Beaux-Rivages–Lac-des-Écorces–Val-Barrette. On June 21, 2003, it changed to its current name.

Campbell-Partie-Est / Lac-des-Écorces / Beaux-Rivages
But originally these three municipalities were part of one entity, the Township Municipality of Campbell-Partie-Est. This was created in 1911 by separating from the rest of Campbell Township (now part of Mont-Laurier), which in turn was proclaimed in 1899 and named after Sir Alexander Campbell (1822-1892).

In 1914, Val-Barrette was split off from Campbell-Partie-Est and became a separate incorporated village. In 1953, Campbell-Partie-Est was renamed to Lac-des-Écorces. In 1955, its main settlement became an independent incorporated village, also called Lac-des-Écorces. In 1984, the township was renamed again, this time to Beaux-Rivages (French for "Beautiful Shores"), a reference to the beauty of the shores of Bark Lake and that of the many other lakes dotting the territory.

Val-Barrette

Thomas Brunet from Thurso is considered the first settler in Val-Barrette who arrived in 1894. But it is named after Zéphirin Barrette, one of the first local land owners. He arrived here in late 1908, and built a hotel and gave the land to build the church. After the settlement became an incorporated village, he became its first mayor (1914-1915), served as the first postmaster (1909-1920), and was the first president of the school board.

Its post office opened in 1909. In 1912, the mission of Saint-Joseph-de-Val-Barrette was founded and became a parish in 1916. Formerly dependent on vegetable crops, wool production, and sawing wood, its economy turns more now toward tourism. Found at this location is one of the largest fish culture stations in Quebec, focusing on raising trout.

Demographics

Population trend prior to amalgamation:
 Population total in 2001: 2715
 Municipality of Beaux-Rivages: 1192
 Village of Lac-des-Écorces: 911
 Village of Val-Barrette: 612
 Population in 1996:
 Municipality of Beaux-Rivages: 1104
 Village of Lac-des-Écorces: 989
 Village of Val-Barrette: 611
 Population in 1991:
 Municipality of Beaux-Rivages: 1025
 Village of Lac-des-Écorces: 949
 Village of Val-Barrette: 551

Private dwellings occupied by usual residents: 1,363 (total dwellings: 1,669)

Mother tongue:
 English as first language: 1%
 French as first language: 97%
 English and French as first language: 1%
 Other as first language: 1%

See also
List of municipalities in Quebec

References

External links

  Municipality of Lac-des-Écorces website

Incorporated places in Laurentides
Municipalities in Quebec
Designated places in Quebec